Allah Noor (born 22 April 2003) is an Afghan cricketer. He made his List A debut for Nangarhar Province in the 2019 Afghanistan Provincial Challenge Cup tournament on 4 August 2019. In December 2021, he was named in Afghanistan's team for the 2022 ICC Under-19 Cricket World Cup in the West Indies.

References

External links
 

2003 births
Living people
Afghan cricketers
Place of birth missing (living people)